Wendy's Style Squad is an American fashion-themed television talk show that premiered on February 16, 2016 on BET. Hosted by Wendy Williams, Bevy Smith, Lloyd Boston, and Robert Verdi, the one-hour long red carpet fashion special series features the panel discussing the best and the worst fashion choices of the award season.

The first episode of the show aired on February 16, 2016, the panel were weighing on fashion looks of the 58th Annual Grammy Awards.

Episodes

References

External links 
 

2010s American television talk shows
2016 American television series debuts
BET original programming
English-language television shows
Fashion-themed reality television series
2016 American television series endings